Progress M-10 was a Soviet and subsequently Russian uncrewed cargo spacecraft which was launched in 1991 to resupply the Mir space station. The twenty-eighth of sixty-four Progress spacecraft to visit Mir, it used the Progress-M 11F615A55 configuration, and had the serial number 211. It carried supplies including food, water and oxygen for the EO-10 crew aboard Mir, as well as equipment for conducting scientific research, and fuel for adjusting the station's orbit and performing manoeuvres. It carried the fourth VBK-Raduga capsule, which was used to return experiment results and equipment to Earth when the Progress was deorbited.

Progress M-10 was launched at 00:05:25 GMT on 17 October 1991, atop a Soyuz-U2 carrier rocket flying from Site 1/5 at the Baikonur Cosmodrome. Following four days of free flight, it docked with the Forward port of the core module on the second attempt, at 03:40:50 GMT on 21 October.

It was launched by the Soviet Union, which was dissolved in December 1991, and along with most aspects of the Soviet space programme, Progress M-10 was inherited by Russia. It undocked from Mir at 07:13:44 GMT on 20 January 1992, and was deorbited few hours later to a destructive reentry over the Pacific Ocean. The Raduga capsule landed at 12:03:30 GMT.

See also

1991 in spaceflight
1992 in spaceflight
List of Progress flights
List of uncrewed spaceflights to Mir

References

Spacecraft launched in 1991
1991 in the Soviet Union
Spacecraft launched in 1992
Progress (spacecraft) missions